The 1995–96 NBA season was the 76ers 47th season in the National Basketball Association, and 33rd season in Philadelphia. The 76ers had the third overall pick in the 1995 NBA draft, and selected Jerry Stackhouse from the University of North Carolina. During the off-season, the team signed free agents Vernon Maxwell, Richard Dumas, then later on in December, signed second-year guard Trevor Ruffin, and veteran point guard Scott Skiles, who then retired in January after only just ten games with the team. 

Stackhouse and Clarence Weatherspoon both provided a nice young nucleus from which to build. However, finding talent to surround them was often difficult, as the Sixers suffered an 11-game losing streak after a 2–2 start. Early into the season, Shawn Bradley was traded along with Greg Graham, and Tim Perry to the New Jersey Nets in exchange for Derrick Coleman, Rex Walters and Sean Higgins; Coleman only played in just eleven games with the Sixers due to an irregular heartbeat. At midseason, second-year forward Sharone Wright was dealt to the expansion Toronto Raptors in exchange for Tony Massenburg and Ed Pinckney, while Jeff Malone was released to free agency, and later signed as a free agent with the Miami Heat. The Sixers went on a nine-game losing streak in January, lost seven straight games in February, held a 9–36 record at the All-Star break, then lost eight straight in March, and had their worst season since the infamous 73-loss 1972–73 season, finishing last place in the Atlantic Division with an 18–64 record. 

Stackhouse averaged 19.2 points and 3.9 assists per game, was named to the NBA All-Rookie First Team, and finished tied in fourth place in Rookie of the Year voting, while Weatherspoon averaged 16.7 points, 9.7 rebounds and 1.4 steals and blocks per game each, and Maxwell provided the team with 16.2 points, 4.4 assists and 1.3 steals per game. In addition, Ruffin contributed 12.8 points and 4.4 assists per game, while Coleman provided with 11.2 points and 6.5 rebounds per game, Higgins contributed 8.0 points per game off the bench, and second-year center Derrick Alston averaged 6.2 points and 4.1 rebounds per game. This would also be the final season the Sixers would play in The Spectrum.

Following the season, Maxwell re-signed with his former team, the San Antonio Spurs, while Massenburg signed with the New Jersey Nets, head coach John Lucas II was fired, and Ruffin, Pinckney, Dumas, Higgins and Alston were all released to free agency.

Offseason

Draft picks

Roster

Roster Notes
Point guard Scott Skiles retired on January 6.

Regular season

Season standings

z - clinched division title
y - clinched division title
x - clinched playoff spot

Record vs. opponents

Awards and records
Jerry Stackhouse, NBA All-Rookie Team 1st Team

Transactions

References

See also
1995-96 NBA season

Philadelphia 76ers seasons
Philadelphia
Philadelphia
Philadelphia